John Davies   (2 March 1839 – 23 May 1896), was a member of the Parliament of New South Wales.

Davies was born in Sydney, the son of John Davies, of New South Wales. In 1861 he married Miss Elisabeth Eaton.

Starting in business as an ironmonger and general blacksmith, he commenced to take an active part in politics on the Liberal side as soon as he was of age. On 1 December 1874 he was elected an alderman for the City of Sydney, serving as an alderman until 1882. He was elected to the Legislative Assembly as one of four members for East Sydney at the election on 9 December 1874, representing this seat until 1880. He was Postmaster-General in the Robertson Government from August to December 1877. Davies was acting British Commissioner at the Sydney International Exhibition in 1879, and was made a Companion of the Order of St Michael and St George in the following year, when he was a Commissioner for New South Wales to the Melbourne International Exhibition; as also for the Amsterdam Exhibition in 1883, and the Colonial and Indian Exhibition in 1886. He was President of the Royal Commission on Friendly Societies.

In 1880 Davies switched to the new district of South Sydney, In 1882 he was defeated for South Sydney, and then a week later was unsuccessful at Kiama. He was returned as a member for South Sydney in 1885, but was defeated again in 1887. He was not well educated and acquired the nickname "Jannery", on account of his inability to correctly spell January, under cross examination by Frederick Darley , during his slander case against John Harris.

References

 

1839 births
Members of the New South Wales Legislative Assembly
Members of the New South Wales Legislative Council
1896 deaths
19th-century Australian politicians
Australian Companions of the Order of St Michael and St George